"Leader of the Band" is a song written by Dan Fogelberg from his 1981 album The Innocent Age. The song was written as a tribute to his father, Lawrence Fogelberg, a musician and the leader of a band, who was still alive at the time the song was released.  Lawrence died in August 1982, but not before this hit song made him a celebrity with numerous media interviews interested in him as its inspiration.

Released as a single at the end of 1981, the tribute peaked at #9 on the Billboard Hot 100 chart in March 1982. It became Fogelberg's second #1 song on the Billboard Adult Contemporary chart, following his 1980 hit "Longer".  On the Radio & Records charts, "Leader of the Band" peaked at #2 on the CHR/Pop chart, and hit #1 on the AC chart.

Charts

Other versions
The Mercey Brothers recorded this song in 1984 for their completion album Latest and Greatest Volume 1.  It would peak at number nine on the Canadian Country Music chart and at number 21 on the Canadian Adult Contemporary chart.
Lucie Arnaz has performed a version of the song as a tribute to her late father, Desi Arnaz.  This is heard in the lyrics as it was changed from A cabinet maker's son to A mayor's son.  Desi's father, Desiderio Alberto Arnaz y Alberni II, served as mayor of Santiago de Cuba from 1928 until 1932 and was also the youngest mayor of that respected city.
Regine Velasquez recorded this song in 2008 for her album Low Key, and she also performed the song to her father, Gerardo Velasquez, while he was still alive.
Zac Brown recorded this song in 2017 as part of a tribute album to Dan Fogelberg. He also dedicated it to his father.

See also
List of number-one adult contemporary singles of 1982 (U.S.)

References

1981 singles
Dan Fogelberg songs
Songs written by Dan Fogelberg
1981 songs
Full Moon Records singles
Songs about fathers
Epic Records singles